Apoorva Mandavilli is an American investigative journalist whose work has focused on medical science. During the COVID-19 pandemic, she joined The New York Times as a health and science writer. In the spring of 2019, she was writer-in-residence at the University of Wisconsin, where she joined a panel discussion on vaccine refusal while writing about containing a measles outbreak in Lowell, Massachusetts. 

Mandavilli is known for her work on autism, most notably being the founding editor-in-chief of Spectrum News, an online resource for the Simons Foundation Autism Research Initiative. She is also a co-founder of Culture Dish, an organization dedicated to enhancing diversity in science journalism, and is the founding chair of the Diversity Committee for the National Association of Science Writers.

Mandavilli was the 2019 winner of the Victor L. Cohn award for scientific journalism.

References

External links
 
 Articles by Apoorva Mandavilli for The New York Times

1970s births
Living people
21st-century American journalists
21st-century American women writers
American women journalists
Journalists from New York City
New York University alumni
University of Wisconsin–Madison alumni